The Mission fig (also known as Black Mission or Franciscana) is a popular variety of the edible fig (Ficus carica). It was first introduced to the United States in 1768 when Franciscan missionaries planted it in San Diego.  It was also planted in the subsequent missions that the Franciscans established up the California coast. Gustav Eisen writes, "The early padres and missionaries in the Pacific coast States cultivated no other variety of fig". It later became the main commercial variety planted throughout California. The Mission fig was later surpassed by the Sari Lop fig (also known as Calimyrna) as the most popular commercial fig variety grown in California.

The Mission fig is a high quality fig variety. It produces both a breba and main crop, and is considered an everbearing variety when planted in the right climate. The breba crop is large.  The main crop is medium-sized. It is a dark skinned fig with a strawberry colored interior. The skin of the fruit often cracks when it is ripe. The tree is long lived and grows to be quite large. It is sensitive to frost. Mission fig trees are almost always infected with Fig mosaic virus, which can affect the color and shape of leaves, but usually does not affect fruit production.  It is still considered one of the highest quality figs that can be grown in USDA zones 9 and up in the United States.

See also
Mission (olive)
Common fig

References